Tom Swift and His Aerial Warship, or, The Naval Terror of the Seas, is Volume 18 in the original Tom Swift novel series published by Grosset & Dunlap.

Plot summary

The story was written in 1915, and World War I, also known as The Great War, was already in progress. As the story opens, Tom is explaining his newest invention to his friend, Ned Newton. Just as Tom is in the middle of explaining the problems he is having, a fire erupts in one of the sheds, where explosives are stored. After the fire has been put out, careful investigation shows that the fire was set deliberately.

In preparation for presenting his new airship to the United States Government, Tom has invited a Lieutenant Marbury, from the Navy, to review his ship. Marbury informs Tom of a possible plot against Tom and his inventions, past and present. Tom scoffs at the idea, but soon finds out otherwise, as his new airship is hijacked by foreign spies with an unknown agenda.

Inventions & Innovation

Tom creates two new inventions for this story: a huge airship for military use, and a method of dealing with recoil on the weapons to be used.

The airship is built on a similar model as the German-built zeppelins. These are huge craft, Tom's measuring at 600 feet in length and 60 feet in diameter. It is built of a semi-rigid airbag with several separated gas compartments, which would permit lift even if one or more of the gas compartments was damaged. Three cabins are hung below the airship: at the front is the pilot house, in the middle is the general quarters, and at the rear is the engine. A non-flammable gas is used for lift, and a single gas-powered engine provides forward momentum. Storage batteries, coupled with an electric motor, are used as backup power in the event of main engine failure. Tom hoped to sell this to the United States government, with an eye on the hostilities occurring in Europe at the time of the story.

Secondary to the airship, Tom needs to conceive of a way to neutralize recoil from the guns which he plans to mount: two 4-inch cannon, and several unspecified machine-guns. When fired, the cannon would generate enough recoil to rip the ship apart, but Tom is inspired by Ned's observation of how an automatic door closer operates. Tom's invention is similar to the recoil system used in the French 75mm field gun.

External links 
 Tom Swift and His Aerial Warship e-text at Project Gutenberg
 

1915 American novels
Tom Swift
American young adult novels
Novels set during World War I
Aviation novels